Melville Bull (September 29, 1854 – July 5, 1909) was a U.S. Representative from Rhode Island.

Born in Newport, Rhode Island, Bull attended Phillips Exeter Academy, Exeter, New Hampshire, and graduated from Harvard University in 1877.  He was then involved in farming in the vicinity of Newport.

He served as member of the State house of representatives from 1883 to 1885 and as a state senator from 1885 to 1892. He served as member of the Republican State central committee and served as delegate to the Republican National Convention in 1888. He also served as Lieutenant Governor of Rhode Island from 1892 to 1894 under Governor D. Russell Brown.

Bull was a charter member of the Rhode Island Society of Colonial Wars in 1897.

Bull was elected as a Republican to the Fifty-fourth and to the three succeeding Congresses (March 4, 1895 to March 3, 1903).
He served as chairman of the Committee on Accounts (Fifty-sixth and Fifty-seventh Congresses).

He was an unsuccessful candidate for reelection in 1902 to the Fifty-eighth Congress.

He lived in Middletown, Rhode Island until his death on July 5, 1909 and was interred in Island Cemetery, Newport, Rhode Island.

Sources

1854 births
1909 deaths
Phillips Exeter Academy alumni
Harvard University alumni
Burials in Rhode Island
Republican Party members of the United States House of Representatives from Rhode Island
Republican Party members of the Rhode Island House of Representatives
Republican Party Rhode Island state senators
Lieutenant Governors of Rhode Island
19th-century American politicians